Drak may refer to:

Drak (mythology), a legendary creature from German folklore
Dorje Drak, one of the Six "Mother" Nyingma Monasteries in Tibet
Karak Drak, race of short, stout humanoids similar to the dwarves of Middle-earth
Lyssa Drak, fictional alien supervillainess published by DC Comics
Zhang Yudrakpa Tsöndru Drak (1122–1193), founder of the Tshalpa Kagyu sect of Tibetan Buddhism
Drak Pack, animated television series
Drak Yerpa, monastery and ancient meditation caves east of Lhasa, Tibet

See also
Bílej kůň, žlutej drak, Czech novel, written by Jan Cempírek
Za humny je drak, 1982 Czechoslovak film
Darak
Darakh
Drac, fictional language of the Dracs, alien species in Barry B. Longyear's The Enemy Papers trilogy
Draka (disambiguation)
Drake (disambiguation)
Drakh, alien race in the Babylon 5 universe
Durack (disambiguation)
Durak

cs:Drak
de:Drak